Rothert is a surname. Notable people with the surname include:

Harlow Rothert (1908–1997), American shot putter
Henry Rothert (1840–1920), American politician and school administrator
Stanisław Jerzy Rothert (1900–1962), Polish journalist and sprinter

See also
Rother (surname)